RHSA may refer to:

 Royal Humane Society of Australasia, an Australian charity
 Rosedale Heights School of the Arts, a high school in Toronto, Canada
 Red Hat Certification Program, Red Hat Certified System Administrator (RHCSA) is often incorrectly abbreviated as RHSA

See also
 Reich Security Main Office (German: Reichssicherheitshauptamt or RSHA), an organization subordinate to Heinrich Himmler